Azwan bin Muhamad Saleh (born 6 January 1988) is a Bruneian professional footballer who plays for DPMM FC as a midfielder or left-sided full-back. His patronym is sometimes erroneously written as Salleh. He is currently the player with the most international appearances for the Brunei national football team with 33 caps.

Club career
Azwan first played club football with QAF FC in the B-League Premier I, gaining his first international appearances while his team was sent to represent the national team for regional qualifying tournaments of the likes of AFC Challenge Cup and the AFF Championship. He transferred to the under-21 team of DPMM in 2007, initially playing as a striker. He played deeper in midfield as the 2007-08 season progressed, which would be the final season DPMM played in Malaysia. Moving to the Singaporean S.League in 2009 with his club, he was a key player for Vjeran Simunić who deployed him on the left side of DPMM's midfield. Their season was ended abruptly due to FIFA's suspension of Brunei, but not before winning the League Cup.

Azwan was loaned to Indera SC in 2010 while his parent club were barred from playing in the S.League. The ban was lifted in 2012 and DPMM retained Azwan who started in their first game back against Tampines Rovers. They replicated their League Cup success that year, with Azwan scoring a direct free-kick in the final.

Due to the emergence of namesake Azwan Ali Rahman from 2014, Azwan switched to a more defensive role, surrendering the number 7 shirt in 2015. He played in 15 games, half of them substitute appearances as DPMM won their first S.League title. He scored his first league goal in 3 years against Geylang International on 5 August via a long-distance shot with his weaker right foot.

In 2022, Azwan added the Brunei FA Cup winner's medal to his collection by winning the trophy on 4 December against Kasuka FC 2–1 in the final on 4 December.

International career
Azwan was a member of the Brunei Under-21s for the 2007 Hassanal Bolkiah Trophy held in his home country. He also played for the Under-23s at the 2008 Sukma Games in Malaysia and captained the side at the 2011 SEA Games in Indonesia.

Azwan holds the record number of appearances for Brunei, with 33 caps to his name. His debut came in the 2006 AFC Challenge Cup in a 0–1 loss against Sri Lanka in Bangladesh. He scored on two occasions in AFF Suzuki Cup qualifying, one against Timor-Leste in 2008, the other against Cambodia in 2012.

Azwan was appointed captain of the national team for the two-legged 2018 World Cup qualifier against Chinese Taipei. The team went down 0–2 at home after an encouraging 1–0 win at Kaohsiung. Azwan joined up with the Wasps for the 2016 AFF Suzuki Cup qualification held in Cambodia in October 2016. With Najib Tarif injured since the first game, he was placed at left-back in the third game against Laos which ended in a 4–3 loss.

Azwan started the first match of the 2016 AFC Solidarity Cup in central midfield against Timor-Leste in Kuching, Malaysia. The match ended 4–0 to the Wasps in their biggest victory of date. He played a total of four games for the Wasps at central midfield in the tournament.

Azwan was in line for an international recall in June 2019 for the 2022 World Cup qualification matches against Mongolia, but made himself unavailable due to unspecified reasons. Three years later, he made his 27th international appearance against Malaysia away in Kuala Lumpur as a substitute in a 4–0 loss on 27 May. In the same year, he clocked another appearance from the bench against Laos in a 1–0 win at Bandar Seri Begawan on 27 September.

On 5 November 2022, Azwan scored the fourth goal against Timor-Leste in a 6–2 win for the Wasps at home in the 2022 AFF Mitsubishi Electric Cup qualifying first leg match. He also made a substitute appearance at the return leg three days later, helping Brunei qualify for the tournament after last competing in 1996. He made three appearances in the group stage, including one from the starting lineup against the Philippines in a 5–1 defeat in Manila on 23 December.

International goals

Honours

Team
DPMM FC
 S.League: 2015
 Singapore Premier League: 2019
 Singapore League Cup (3): 2009, 2012, 2014
 Brunei FA Cup: 2022

External links

References 

Bruneian footballers
Brunei international footballers
Living people
1988 births
DPMM FC players
Indera SC players
Association football midfielders
Association football fullbacks
Competitors at the 2011 Southeast Asian Games
Southeast Asian Games competitors for Brunei